Greenwood County was a county of the Territory of Colorado that existed for four years from 1870 to 1874.

History
On November 2, 1870, the Colorado General Assembly created Greenwood County from former Cheyenne and Arapaho tribal land and the eastern portion of Huerfano County.  It was named for William Henry Greenwood, Chief of the Kansas Pacific Railway surveys to the Pacific. Later, with William Jackson Palmer, organized the Denver & Rio Grande Railroad in 1870. On February 6, 1874, the Colorado General Assembly abolished Greenwood County and split its territory between Elbert County and Bent County.

See also

Outline of Colorado
Index of Colorado-related articles
Historic Colorado counties
Bent County, Colorado
Elbert County, Colorado
Huerfano County, Colorado

References

Former counties of Colorado
Elbert County, Colorado
Bent County, Colorado